Fran Miholjević (born 2 August 2002) is a Croatian cyclist, who currently rides for UCI WorldTeam .

Major results

2019
 National Junior Road Championships
1st  Time trial
2nd Road race
 1st Overall Belgrade Trophy Milan Panić
1st Young rider classification
1st Stage 1b
 6th Gran Premio Eccellenze Valli del Soligo
 9th Trofeo Guido Dorigo
2020
 National Junior Road Championships
1st  Road race
1st  Time trial
 4th Time trial, UEC European Junior Road Championships
2021
 1st  Time trial, National Under-23 Road Championships
 2nd Road race, National Road Championships
 3rd Overall Carpathian Couriers Race
1st  Young rider classification
1st Prologue
 4th GP Capodarco
2022
 1st  Time trial, National Road Championships
 1st  Overall Carpathian Couriers Race
1st  Points classification
1st  Young rider classification
1st Stage 1
 1st GP Vipava Valley & Crossborder Goriška
 1st Stage 3 Giro di Sicilia
 1st Stage 1 Giro della Friuli Venezia Giulia
 2nd  Time trial, UEC European Under-23 Road Championships
 2nd Trofeo Città di San Vendemiano

References

External links

2002 births
Living people
Croatian male cyclists